Medford R. "Med" Park (April 11, 1933 – July 23, 1998) was an American professional basketball player.

Park grew up in Lexington, Missouri. Park attended Wentworth Military Academy in Lexington from 1947 to 1951 and was a star athlete. He then went on to become an All-American basketball player for the University of Missouri. A 6'2" guard/forward, Park played five seasons (1955–1960) in the National Basketball Association as a member of the St. Louis Hawks and Cincinnati Royals. He averaged 6.1 points per game and won a league championship with St. Louis in 1958.  He also played one season with the Washington Generals.

External links

NBA Champion: Med Park once called Hannibal home

1933 births
1998 deaths
American men's basketball players
Basketball players from Missouri
Cincinnati Royals players
Missouri Tigers men's basketball players
People from Lexington, Missouri
Shooting guards
Small forwards
Sportspeople from the Kansas City metropolitan area
St. Louis Hawks players
Undrafted National Basketball Association players
Washington Generals players
Wentworth Military Academy and College alumni